= Soviet locomotive class VM =

VM
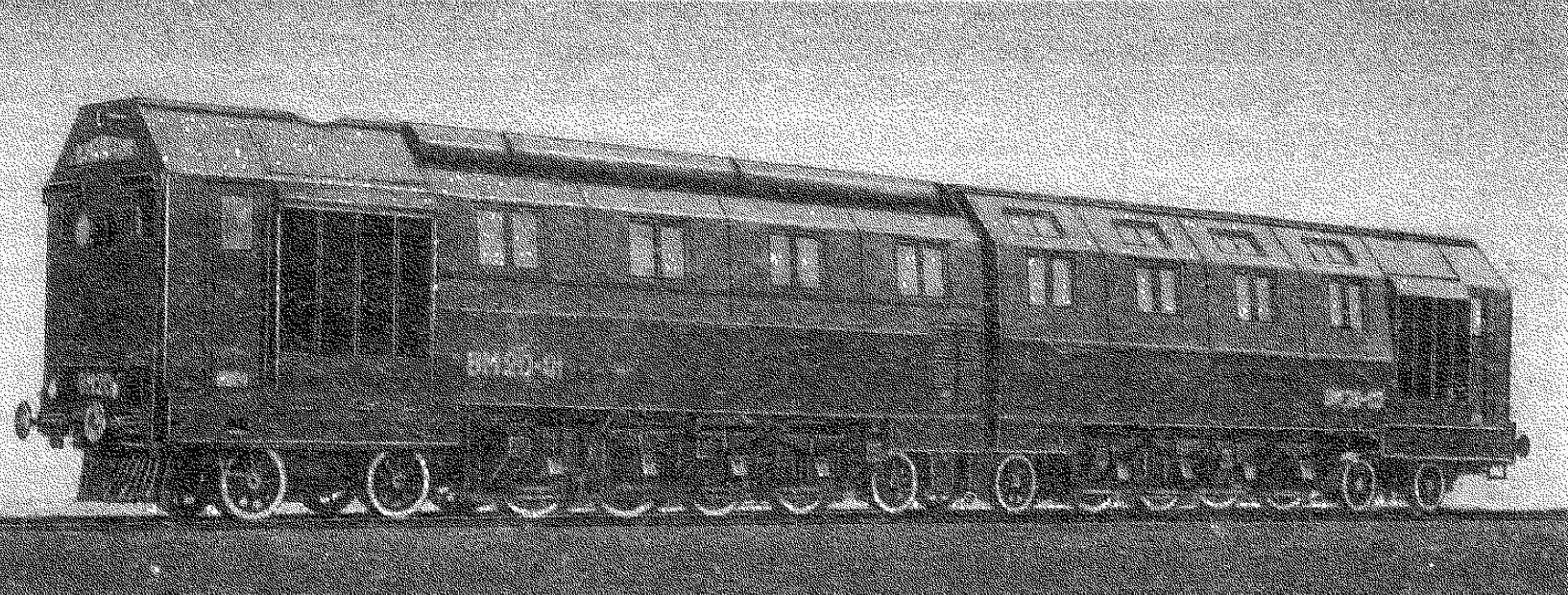
- VM or BM class diesel-electric locomotive
Type and origin
- Power type: Diesel-electric
- Build date: 1934
Specifications
- Configuration
  - UIC: 2-Do-1+1-Do-2
- Loco weight: 2 x 123 tonnes (121 long tons; 136 short tons)
- Prime mover: Two Soviet-built diesel engines MAN design
- RPM range: Max. 400 rpm
- Transmission: Diesel-electric; 8 x 207 hp (154 kW) traction motors
Performance figures
- Power output: 2 x 1,050 hp (780 kW) (diesel)
Career
- Number in class: 1 pair

The VM (Russian: ВМ; Ukrainian: ВМ) was an experimental Soviet diesel-electric locomotive named after Vyacheslav Molotov (Russian: Вячеслав Молотов; Ukrainian: В'ячеслав Молотов). It was a two-unit machine of 2-Do-1+1-Do-2 wheel arrangement and only one pair of locomotives was built.

== Powertrain ==
The two diesel engines were of the six cylinder, four stroke type. They were Soviet-built and based on the MAN engine used in the Soviet E el-5 locomotive. The MAN engine was rated at 1,200 hp (890 kW) at 450 rpm but the Soviet engines were de-rated to 1,050 hp (780 kW) at 400 rpm. The traction motors were similar to those used in the Soviet E el-12 locomotive but the rating of each motor was increased from 190 hp (140 kW) to 207 hp (154 kW).
